Can This Be Dixie? is a 1936 American film featuring child star Jane Withers.

In 1937 and 1938, Withers became one of the top 10 box-office stars in the United States, despite her status as Fox's second-tier child star (behind Shirley Temple). On a shooting schedule that allowed 21 to 24 days per picture, she acquired the nickname "One-Take Withers", and produced four or five films a year.

The level of comedy can be assessed by the names of the characters, the names of the musical numbers ("Pick, Pick, Pickaninny," "Uncle Tom's Cabin is a Cabaret Now"), and the fact that Withers appeared in blackface. Some even more racially offensive material was challenged by co-star Hattie McDaniel and removed from the picture.

Plot
Peg Gurgle, who, with her uncle Robert E. Lee Gurgle, runs a traveling musical patent medicine show through the deep south.  When they encounter a plantation owner named Colonel Robert E. Lee Peachtree, their luck picks up when the Colonel buys a bottle of their elixir for each one of his plantation field hands.  When the sheriff impounds their wagon, the Gurgles stay on with the Colonel and helps defend his mansion against Yankees and bankers.

Cast 

 Jane Withers as Peg Gurgle
 Slim Summerville as Robert E. Lee Gurgle
 Helen Wood as Virginia Peachtree
 Thomas Beck as Ulysses S. Sherman
 Sara Haden as Miss Beauregard Peachtree
 Claude Gillingwater as Col. Robert Peachtree
 Donald Cook as Longstreet Butler
 James Burke as Sheriff N.B.F. Rider
 Jed Prouty as Ed Grant
 Hattie McDaniel as Lizzie
 Troy Brown Sr. as Jeff Davis Brunch 
 Robert Warwick as Gen. Beauregard Peachtree
 Billy Bletcher as John P. Smith Peachtree
 William Worthington as George Washington Peachtree
 Otis Harlan as Thoma Jefferson Peachtree

References

External links 
 
 Turner Classic Movies page

1936 films
Films directed by George Marshall
20th Century Fox films
Films with screenplays by Lamar Trotti
American black-and-white films
American musical comedy films
1936 musical comedy films
Films scored by Samuel Kaylin
1930s American films